Vasil Grigorovich Barsky (Russian: Василий Григорьевич Григорович-Барский; born 1 (N.S. 12) January 1701 - died 7 (18) October 1747) was an Eastern Orthodox monk and traveller from Kiev. He spent more than 20 years travelling around Southern Europe and the Middle East, leaving an autobiographic account of his journeys.

He is best remembered as a scholar who stayed at Hilandar twice, in 1725 and 1744. From the scholarly perspective, the more important was his second visit, when he wrote a detailed description of Hilandar and its antiquities.

His first name may be romanized as Basil, Vasili, Vasyl or Vasil.

Biography

Grigorovich-Barsky was born in Kiev or in Litky near Kiev, then part of Imperial Russia. He came from a rich merchant family originally from the town of Bar in Podillia. Vasyl's younger brother Ivan Grihorovich-Barsky became a well-known architect. Before 1710, the family moved to Kyiv, where Vasyl's father served as a prefect of Pyrohoshcha Church. Against his father's will, Vasyl enlisted in the Kyiv-Mohyla Academy. However, in 1723 he had to leave the studies due to ill health and traveled to Lviv (then part of the Polish–Lithuanian Commonwealth) to seek medical advice. There Grigorovich-Barsky, disguised as a Uniate, became a student in a Jesuit academy.

In 1724, after a conflict at the academy, Grigorovich-Barsky left Lviv and started his journey, during which he visited Pest, Vienna, Bari, Rome, Venice, Corfu, Mount Athos, Palestine, Egypt and Cyprus. In Alexandria Grigorovich-Barsky lived at the court of the Patriarch. In 1729-1731 he stayed in Tripoli, learning Greek. In 1734, in Damascus, he was tonsured a monk with the name Basil and ordained a subdeacon by Patriarch Sylvester of Antioch. From October 1734 to April 1735, at the request of the Archbishop Philotheos of Cyprus, he taught Latin in a local school in Cyprus and lived in the archbishop's farmstead.  

From 1736 to 1743 he lived on the island of Patmos, where he continued to study language, logic and metaphysics and at the same time taught Latin at a local school. In 1743 he was appointed a priest at the Russian embassy in Constantinople by empress Yelizaveta Petrovna, and for the next two years studied documents in the libraries of Mount Athos.

Vasyl Grigorovich-Barsky were in Athos, Athens and Crete from 1744 to 1746. He returned to Constantinople in 1746, where he had a conflict with the new Russian diplomat, Adrian Ivanovich Neplyuev, who accused him for Philhellenism and betrayal of national interests. Vasyl was afraid to be arrested and wanted to prove the injustice of accusation against him. He returned to Kiev in the 2d of October 1747 through Bulgaria, Wallachia and Poland. As he was severe ill at that time, he died a month later. 

His image is described by his brother and placed in the preface to the first edition of his notes: “There is no portrait of this father Vasily, but he was of the following signs: he is tall, the hair on his head and beard is black without any gray hair, his face is dark, his body is portly, his eyebrows are black, high , large and almost together converged, eyes are sharp, brown, nose is short; both in dress, and in the pronunciation of speeches and posture, he looked like a Greek; why his own mother, upon his return to the house after 24 years of travel, could not find out even after an hour in conversations; in other things, he had a cheerful and playful disposition, was curious about all kinds of sciences and arts, and especially to drawing, and from childhood he had a desire to see foreign countries, and he did it by the very deed".

A detailed biography of V. Grigorovich-Barsky is set out in the preface to the full edition of his book by the publisher N.P. Barsukov, which was also published as a separate book.

References

1701 births
1747 deaths
Ukrainian writers
Ukrainian monks
National University of Kyiv-Mohyla Academy alumni
People associated with Hilandar Monastery